Stanislovas Gediminas Ilgūnas (March 29, 1936 – April 8, 2010) was a Lithuanian politician. In 1990, he was among those who signed the Act of the Re-Establishment of the State of Lithuania.

References

1936 births
2010 deaths
Lithuanian politicians
Signatories of the Act of the Re-Establishment of the State of Lithuania